Max Schlosser (5 February 1854 – 7 October 1932) was a German zoologist and paleontologist.  He is best known for his research on extinct primates and Caniformia.

External links
 Schlosser Biography from Scribd

German paleontologists
19th-century German zoologists
Place of birth missing
Place of death missing
1854 births
1932 deaths
20th-century German zoologists